This page documents confirmed tornadoes in October, November, and December 2020 via various weather forecast offices of the National Weather Service. Based on the 1991–2010 averaging period, 61 tornadoes occur across the United States throughout October, 58 through November, and 24 through December.

Similar to the previous two months, a large portion of the tornadoes that touched down in October were produced by tropical cyclones, although it was still well below average with only 18 tornadoes being confirmed with no significant (EF2+) tornadoes being confirmed. November saw one tropical tornado and was also significantly below average with only 21 tornadoes. December tornado activity did not start until about midway through the month. There were 26 tornadoes during the month, which was comparable to the average.

United States yearly total

October

October 7 event

October 9 event
Event was associated with Hurricane Delta.

October 10 event
Events in the Southeastern U.S. were associated with Hurricane Delta.

October 11 event
Events were associated with Hurricane Delta.

October 23 event

October 28 event
Event was associated with Hurricane Zeta.

November

November 10 event

November 11 event
Event was associated with Hurricane Eta.

November 15 event

November 18 event

November 24 event

November 25 event

November 27 event

November 30 event

December

December 13 event

December 14 event

December 16 event

December 23 event

December 24 event

December 30 event

See also
 Tornadoes of 2020
 List of United States tornadoes from August to September 2020
 List of United States tornadoes from January to March 2021

Notes

References 

2020-related lists
Tornadoes of 2020
Tornadoes
2020 natural disasters in the United States
Tornadoes in the United States